Pilidiella quercicola is a plant pathogen infecting strawberries.

References

External links 
 Index Fungorum
 USDA ARS Fungal Database

Fungal strawberry diseases
Fungi described in 1927
Diaporthales